Greatest Hits Radio East is a regional radio network serving the East of England, as part of Bauer’s Greatest Hits Radio network.

Stations

After acquiring several businesses in early 2019, in May 2020, Bauer announced many of their radio stations would rebrand and join the Greatest Hits Radio network, including six stations in the East of England:
 
Essex - Greatest Hits Radio Essex
Ipswich & Suffolk - DAB only
Norfolk & North Suffolk - The Beach, North Norfolk Radio and Radio Norwich 99.9
 King's Lynn and West Norfolk - KL.FM 96.7
Cambridgeshire - from 3rd April

Programming
The station carries primarily a schedule of networked programming, produced and broadcast from Bauer's Birmingham, Glasgow, Liverpool, London and Manchester studios.

On weekdays, the station opts out of networked programming for a regional three-hour afternoon show from 1-4pm with Heidi Secker, originating from Bauer's Norwich studios.

News
Bauer's Norwich newsroom broadcasts local news bulletins hourly from 6am to 7pm on weekdays and from 7am to 1pm at weekends. Headlines are broadcast on the half-hour during weekday breakfast and drivetime shows, alongside traffic bulletins. National bulletins from Sky News Radio are carried at other times.

References

External links
 Official website

Bauer Radio
Greatest Hits Radio
Radio stations established in 2020